Jerusalem International Airport , (also Kalandia Airport, Qalandia Airport, and Atarot Airport) is a regional airport, currently not in use, located between Jerusalem and Ramallah. When it was opened in 1924 it was the first airport in the British Mandate for Palestine.

Under the British Mandate in Palestine Cyprus Airways flew to the airport, and this continued intermittently after Cyprus gained independence from Britain in 1960, and Royal Jordanian and Middle East Airlines were known to operate daily commercial flights to and from Atarot airport between 1948 and 1967 under Jordanian rule. 

After Israel occupied the West Bank during the Six-Day War in 1967, it came under Israeli occupation. It was annexed to Israel in 1981 under the Jerusalem Law. Arkia and El Al Israel Airlines operated daily commercial flights to and from the airport between 1967 and 2001, when the airport was closed to civilian traffic after the breakout of the Second Intifada in 2000.

History
From 1924 until 1927, the airfield in Kalandia was the only airport in the British Mandate for Palestine. It was used by the British military authorities and prominent guests bound for Jerusalem.  In 1931, the Mandatory government expropriated land from the Jewish village of Atarot to expand the airfield, in the process demolishing homes and uprooting fruit orchards.  In 1936, the airport was opened for regular flights. The village of Atarot was captured and destroyed by the Jordanian Arab Legion during the 1948 Arab-Israeli War.

From 1948 to the Six-Day War in June 1967, the airport was under Jordanian control, designated OJJR. Following the Six Day War, the Jerusalem airport was incorporated into the Jerusalem city municipal area and was designated LLJR.

In the 1970s and early 1980s, Israel invested considerable resources in upgrading the airport and creating the infrastructure for a full-fledged international airport but the international aviation authorities, bearing in mind that the airport was in lands captured in 1967 by Israel, would not allow international flights to land there. Thus the airport was only used for domestic flights and charter flights.

Due to security issues during the Second Intifada, the airport was closed to civilian air traffic in October 2000 and by July 2001 it was formally handed over to the Israel Defense Forces.

In maps presented by Israel at the 2000 Camp David Summit, Atarot was included in the Israeli built-up area of Jerusalem.  This was rejected by the Palestinian delegation, which envisioned it as a national airport for the Palestinians. Yossi Beilin proposed that the airport be used jointly as part of an overall sharing of Jerusalem between Israel and Palestinian Authority, citing the successful model of Geneva International Airport, which is used by both Switzerland and France.

Atarot settlement plan
A planning committee was scheduled to discuss on 6 December 2021, a proposal for 9,000 housing units. The site is between the Beit Hanina and Kafr Aqab, the "last free space for development left for Palestinians in the Jerusalem area."

However on 25 November 2021, under pressure from the Biden administration in the United States, Israel has shelved plans to redevelop Jerusalem airport site.

Gallery

ICAO codes
The airport is sometimes shown with two different ICAO codes. The LL designator is used by ICAO for airports in Israel and OJ is the code for Jordan.

In popular culture
The airport is depicted in the film World War Z as the main Israeli airport defended from a zombie epidemic. In reality all the Israeli scenes in the film were shot in Malta.

See also
Ben Gurion International Airport

References

External links

Airports in the West Bank
Transport in Jerusalem
Buildings and structures in Jerusalem
1924 establishments in Mandatory Palestine